Peña Adobe is a historic building in Vacaville, California, United States.

History

It was built in 1842 by the Californios. It was designed by Juan Felipe Peña. It was located on the Rancho Los Putos. It is situated on 1.5 acres. It is owned by the Peña Adobe Historical Society and is open to the public on the first Saturday of the month.

The Peña Adobe is now part of the city's Peña Adobe Park, which includes the Mowers-Goheen Museum, the Willis Linn Jepson Memorial Garden, Indian Council Ground and picnic and recreation facilities.

References

External links
 Peña Adobe Historical Society

Museums in Solano County, California
Buildings and structures in Vacaville, California
Historic house museums in California
Adobe buildings and structures in California
Buildings and structures completed in 1842
1842 establishments in Alta California